Alypophanes iridocosma is a moth of the family Noctuidae. It is found in Queensland (in rainforest from Iron Range south to Ingham).

Adults have yellow wings with black and red markings. There is a prominent white spot on the abdomen. While resting, the forewings and hind wings are disconnected.

References

External links
Australian Faunal Directory
Australian Insects

Moths of Queensland
Acontiinae
Moths described in 1908